The RK (Razdvizhnoye Krylo – extending wing) (a.k.a. LIG-7) was a two-seat cabin aircraft designed and built in the USSR from April 1936.

Development 
In 1930 the LIIPS ( - Leningrad institute for sail and communications engineers) formed a UK GVF ( - training centre for civil air fleet), in turn the UK GVF formed the NIAI (Naoochno-Issledovatel'skiy Aero-Institoot - scientific test aero-institute) which became the focus of several good design engineers who were given command of individual OKB (Osboye Konstrooktorskoye Byuro – personal design/construction bureau).

Along with contemporary aircraft designers, in the USSR and abroad, Grigorii Ivanovich Bakshayev was interested in the concept of variable geometry aircraft, where the size and/or shape of wings are altered according to the stage of flight, or desired characteristics. One methods of achieving this was with a telescopic wing, where wing sections of bigger aerofoil section and area are telescoped out over the original wing. He designed the RK to use a telescopic wing  with six sections, of gradually increasing size, extending outwards from the fuselage to the demands of the pilot.

The airframe of the RK was a simple structure of steel tube fuselage and a wire braced monoplane wing of constant M-6 section constructed of wood. The extending wing sections were each 460 mm wide and were extended by the observer in the rear cockpit operating a hand-crank connected to cables via a pulley system to pull each section out in turn, with each section pulling the next behind it. Successful flight tests starting in 1937 led to authorisation for a fighter with telescopic wings to be designed and built; The RK-I (Razdvizhnoye Krylo - Istrebitel – extending wing fighter).

Specifications (RK)

See also

References

 Gunston, Bill. “The Osprey Encyclopaedia of Russian Aircraft 1875–1995”. London, Osprey. 1995. 

1930s Soviet experimental aircraft
NIAI aircraft
Aircraft first flown in 1937